Junín may refer to:

Places

Argentina
Junín Partido 
Junín, Buenos Aires 
Junín Airport
Junín Department, Mendoza 
Junín, Mendoza 
Junín Department, San Luis
Junín de los Andes, Neuquén

Colombia
Junín, Cundinamarca
Junín, Nariño

Ecuador
Junín Canton, in Manabí Province

Peru
Department of Junín
Junín Province
Junín, Peru
Junín District
Lake Junin, also known as Chinchayqucha
Junín National Reserve

Venezuela
Junín Municipality, Táchira

See also

Battle of Junín, during the Peruvian War of Independence in 1824